FP4 may refer to:
 CFP4, an International Civil Aviation Organization airport code for McQuesten Airport, Yukon, Canada
 FP4 plus, a black-and-white photographic film by Ilford Photo, latest version being called FP4 Plus or FP4+
 Fourth Framework Programme (FP4), a European Union Research Project
 The Roland FP4, an electric piano
 Fairphone 4